Gallows View is the first novel by Canadian detective fiction writer Peter Robinson in the Inspector Banks series of novels. The novel was first printed in 1987, but has been reprinted a number of times since.

Plot
A Peeping Tom is frightening the women of Eastvale; two glue-sniffing young thugs are breaking into homes and robbing people; an old woman may or may not have been murdered. Investigating these cases is Detective Chief Inspector Alan Banks, a perceptive, curious and compassionate policeman recently moved to the Yorkshire Dales from London to escape the stress of city life. In addition to all this, Banks has to deal with the local feminists and his attraction to a young psychologist, Jenny Fuller. As the tension mounts, both Jenny and Banks’s wife, Sandra, are drawn deeper into the events. The cases weave together as the story reaches a tense and surprising climax.

External links
Dedicated page on author's website

1987 Canadian novels
Novels by Peter Robinson (novelist)
Novels set in Yorkshire
Viking Press books